The Frank–Tamm formula yields the amount of Cherenkov radiation emitted on a given frequency as a charged particle moves through a medium at superluminal velocity. It is named for Russian physicists Ilya Frank and Igor Tamm who developed the theory of the Cherenkov effect in 1937, for which they were awarded a Nobel Prize in Physics in 1958.

When a charged particle moves faster than the phase speed of light in a medium, electrons interacting  with the particle can emit coherent photons while conserving energy and momentum. This process can be viewed as a decay. See Cherenkov radiation and nonradiation condition for an explanation of this effect.

Equation
The energy  emitted per unit length travelled by the particle per unit of frequency  is:

provided that .

Cherenkov radiation does not have characteristic spectral peaks, as typical for fluorescence or emission spectra. The relative intensity of one frequency is approximately proportional to the frequency. That is, higher frequencies (shorter wavelengths) are more intense in Cherenkov radiation. This is why visible Cherenkov radiation is observed to be brilliant blue. In fact, most Cherenkov radiation is in the ultraviolet spectrum; the sensitivity of the human eye peaks at green, and is very low in the violet portion of the spectrum.

The total amount of energy radiated per unit length is:

This integral is done over the frequencies  for which the particle's speed  is greater than speed of light of the media . The integral is convergent (finite) because at high frequencies the refractive index becomes less than unity and for extremely high frequencies it becomes unity.

Derivation of Frank–Tamm formula 
Consider a charged particle moving relativistically along -axis in a medium with refraction index   with a constant velocity . Start with Maxwell's equations (in Gaussian units) in the wave forms (also known as the Lorenz gauge condition) and take the Fourier transform:

Substituting this density and charge current into the wave equation, we can solve for the Fourier-form potentials:
 and 

Using the definition of the electromagnetic fields in terms of potentials, we then have the Fourier-form of the electric and magnetic field:
 and 

It is given by the inverse Fourier transform:

First we compute -component  of the electric field (parallel to ):

For brevity we define . Breaking the integral apart into , the  integral can immediately be integrated by the definition of the Dirac Delta:

The integral over  has the value , giving:

One can follow a similar pattern of calculation for the other fields components arriving at:

  and 

It can be expressed through the electromagnetic energy flow  through the surface of an infinite cylinder of radius  around the path of the moving particle, which is given by the integral of the Poynting vector  over the cylinder surface:

Using :

Converting this to the frequency domain:

To go into the domain of Cherenkov radiation, we now consider perpendicular distance  much greater than atomic distances in a medium, that is, . With this assumption we can expand the Bessel functions into their asymptotic form:

  and 

Thus:
 

If  has a positive real part (usually true), the exponential will cause the expression to vanish rapidly at large distances, meaning all the energy is deposited near the path.

That is, when  is real, Cherenkov radiation has the condition that . This is the statement that the speed of the particle must be larger than the phase velocity of electromagnetic fields in the medium at frequency  in order to have Cherenkov radiation. With this purely imaginary  condition,  and the integral can be simplified to:

This is the Frank–Tamm equation in Gaussian units.

Notes

References

External links
Cherenkov radiation (Tagged ‘Frank-Tamm formula’)

Particle physics
Experimental particle physics
Equations of physics